The 1st Air Reconnaissance Regiment (1. пук ВОЈИН) was an air reconnaissance regiment established in 1955 as the SFR Yugoslav Air Force 211th Air Reconnaissance Regiment.

History
The 211th Air Reconnaissance Regiment was established on 8 June 1955, from the 101st Air Reconnaissance Battalion and 103rd Air Reconnaissance Battalion with its headquarters at Belgrade. As part of the "Drvar" re-organisation plan in 1959, the regiment was redesignated as the 1st Air Reconnaissance Regiment. In accordance with an order issued on 27 January 1963, its reserve location was changed from Zemun to Batajnica. On 12 June 1992, the regimental headquarters was transformed into the headquarters of the 126th Air Reconnaissance Brigade.

Assignments
7th Aviation Corps (1955–1959)
1st Air Command (1959–1964)
1st Air Defense Zone (1964–1966)
11th Air Defense Division (1966–1986)
1st Corps of Air Force and Air Defense (1986–1992)

Previous designations
211st Air Reconnaissance Regiment (1955–1959)
1st Air Reconnaissance Regiment (1959–1992)

Commanding officers
 Colonel Milan Milićević
 Colonel Janko Rajčević
 Colonel Darko Milosević
 Colonel Đuro Rodić
 Colonel Svetlok Kostić
 Colonel Žarko Zrnić
 Colonel Michael Žugić
 Colonel Žarko Zrnić

References

Regiments of Yugoslav Air Force
Military units and formations established in 1955
Military units and formations established in 1992
1955 establishments in Yugoslavia